Boaco is a department in Nicaragua. It was formed in 1938 out of part of Chontales Department. It covers an area of 4,177 km2 and has a population of 186,284 (2021 estimate). The capital is the city of Boaco. Indigenous peoples are the Nahuas and Sumos.

Municipalities 

 Boaco
 Camoapa
 San José de los Remates
 San Lorenzo
 Santa Lucía
 Teustepe

References 

 
Departments of Nicaragua
States and territories established in 1938